Draco timoriensis, also known as the Timor flying dragon, is a species of lizard endemic to the Lesser Sunda Islands in Indonesia and East Timor.

References

timoriensis
Reptiles of Indonesia
Reptiles of Timor
Reptiles described in 1820
Taxa named by Heinrich Kuhl